Wandalin may refer to the following places:
Wandalin, Łódź Voivodeship (central Poland)
Wandalin, Lublin Voivodeship (east Poland)
Wandalin, Podlaskie Voivodeship (north-east Poland)